Hefter is a surname. Notable people with the surname include:

Alfred Hefter (1892–1957), Romanian poet, journalist, and writer of Jewish descent
Gus Hefter, Australian rules footballer
Richard Hefter (born  1942), American writer

See also
19423 Hefter
Heffer (disambiguation)